Yogesh Nagar (born 6 January 1990 in Wazirabad, Delhi) is an Indian cricketer. He is an allrounder who is a right hand batsman and off spinner. He plays for the Delhi Ranji Trophy side and the Delhi under-16 side. He played for the Delhi Daredevils in the Indian Premier League.

References

1990 births
Living people
Indian cricketers
Delhi Capitals cricketers
Delhi cricketers
North Zone cricketers
Meghalaya cricketers
Cricketers from Delhi